Jeffrey David Berwick (born November 24, 1970) is a Canadian-Dominican entrepreneur, libertarian and anarcho-capitalist activist.

Berwick founded Stockhouse, a penny stock promotion and marketing site, which he later sold. He later was an investor in bitcoin, appearing publicly on Fox News and other mainstream press outlets to discuss the digital currency. He also appeared on Bloomberg to discuss Bitcoin.

In 2016, Berwick acquired Dominican Republic citizenship.

Career

In 2009, he founded The Dollar Vigilante, an anarcho-capitalist blog focusing on gold, silver, mining stocks, Bitcoin and offshore banking.

Berwick was host of Anarchast, an interview-style anarcho-capitalist podcast founded in 2012.

In 2013, Berwick announced his plans to co-found the world's first bitcoin ATM in Cyprus. Business Insider called the plans "bogus" and "almost certainly nonsense."

In 2013, Berwick promoted Galt's Gulch Chile project, a libertarian enclave in the Curacaví region of Chile that did not come to fruition as envisioned. He was also part of an attempt to start a free-trade zone in Honduras.

In 2015, Berwick started Anarchapulco, an annual anarcho-capitalist conference held in Acapulco, Mexico.

Media Coverage

In 2022 HBO released an original six-part television documentary series entitled The Anarchists.  The series is based on six years of video collected by Todd Schramke, and focuses on Berwick, his beliefs, and several of his adherents, including Nathan and Lisa Freeman and a couple known as John Galton and Lily Forester.

Personal life
In July 2005, Berwick's catamaran, caught in a 50 knot squall, was driven into the rocks and sank. Berwick and his partner survived by holding onto a broken surfboard.

References

External links
''Anarchast – Berwick's video podcast with discussions on anarchist-related issues.

1970 births
Living people
Anarcho-capitalists
Businesspeople from Edmonton
Canadian businesspeople
Canadian economics writers
Canadian finance and investment writers
Canadian libertarians
Canadian emigrants to Mexico
Naturalized citizens of the Dominican Republic
Writers from Edmonton